This List of National Council of Churches members and observers mentions the individual communions which are members or observers of the National Council of the Churches of Christ in the USA.

African Methodist Episcopal Church
African Methodist Episcopal Zion Church
Alliance of Baptists
American Baptist Churches USA
Diocese of the Armenian Church of America
Assyrian Church of the East
Christian Church (Disciples of Christ)
Christian Methodist Episcopal Church
Church of the Brethren
Community of Christ
Coptic Orthodox Church in North America
Ecumenical Catholic Communion
Episcopal Church in the United States of America
Evangelical Lutheran Church in America
Greek Orthodox Archdiocese of America
Hungarian Reformed Church in America
International Council of Community Churches
Korean Presbyterian Church Abroad
Malankara Orthodox Syrian Church, American diocese
Mar Thoma Church
Moravian Church in America
National Baptist Convention of America
National Baptist Convention, USA, Inc.
National Missionary Baptist Convention of America
Orthodox Church in America
Patriarchal Parishes of the Russian Orthodox Church in the USA
Polish National Catholic Church
Presbyterian Church (USA)
Progressive National Baptist Convention, Inc.
Reformed Church in America
Religious Society of Friends (Quakers), Friends United Meeting 
Religious Society of Friends (Quakers), Philadelphia Yearly Meeting
Serbian Orthodox Church in the USA and Canada
Swedenborgian Church of North America
Syriac Orthodox Church of Antioch, archdiocese of the Eastern U.S.A.
Ukrainian Orthodox Church of the USA
United Church of Christ
United Methodist Church

Observer Status:
Church of Christ, Scientist

References

External links
 Member Communions, National Council of Churches website (last checked 6 September 2019)